R. G. Kar Medical College and Hospital is a government owned medical college and hospital in Shyambazar, Kolkata, West Bengal, India. It was established in 1886 to ensure self-sufficiency (Swaraj) in medical education and services in the colonial era. It was under University of Calcutta from 1916 to 2003 and affiliated to West Bengal University of Health Sciences when it was established in 2003. R.G. Kar Medical College and Hospital completed 100 years of its service in 2016. This college is a co-educational institution that is recognized by the MCI and affiliated with the West Bengal University of Health Sciences.

History
Established in 1886 as the Calcutta School of Medicine, it had no affiliated hospital and practiced out of Mayo Hospital. In 1902, it moved to its own complex including a school building and hospital. In 1904, it merged with the National College of Physicians and Surgeons of Bengal and, after a period of further growth, was renamed as the Belgachia Medical College in 1916. From 1918 to 1948, the college was known as Carmichael Medical College in honor of Thomas Gibson-Carmichael, the Governor of Bengal at the college's inauguration in 1916. The institution was given its current name on 12 May 1948 to honor Dr. Radha Govinda Kar who first conceived of it. Suresh Prasad Sarbadhikari was the first President of the institution, and Kar was its first Secretary. In May 1958, control of the college was passed to West Bengal's government.

Location 
The closest bus stand to the institution in the R.G Kar Road Bus Stand.

Courses 
R. G. Kar Medical College and Hospital provides an undergraduate course that is MBBS, as well as postgraduate degree & diploma courses and super speciality courses. These courses are offered by the institute under various departments such as Anatomy, General Medicine, Anesthesiology, Biochemistry, Physiology, Medicine, Ophthalmology, Cardiology and many more.

Facilities 

 Canteen 
 Computer Laboratories 
 Library
 Medical Facilities

See also
 Calcutta Homoeopathic Medical College & Hospital
 Calcutta Unani Medical College and Hospital
 List of hospitals in India
 Healthcare in India

References

External links

 

Affiliates of West Bengal University of Health Sciences
Medical Council of India
Hospitals established in 1902
Medical colleges in West Bengal
1902 establishments in British India